GISD is an acronym that may refer to:
Independent School Districts in Texas - G
Global Invasive Species Database